The electricity sector in Belgium describes electricity in Belgium. Production by power source in 2009 was 53% nuclear, 40% fossil electricity and 7% renewable electricity. 2% of production was exported in 2009. In 2008 import was 11%. Belgium is highly nuclear dependent country where the share of renewable electricity has been  low. The share of renewable electricity was about 2% in 2005. Plan for 2020 is wind 10.5 TWh (9.5%), biomass 11 TWh and PV 1 TWh.

Total electricity consumption was 91 TWh in 2008. Finland had about same consumption 87 TWh with only half of Belgium’s population. In 2009 consumption was 8,152 kWh per person.

Electricity per capita by power source 
In 2008 Belgium consumed electricity 8,961 kWh/person. EU15 average was  7,409 kWh/person.

Import 
The electricity import in Belgium was 11 TWh in 2008. This was seventh highest import in the world behind Brazil (42 TWh), Italy (40 TWh), USA (33 TWh), the Netherlands (16 TWh), Finland (13 TWh), and the UK (11 TWh).

Most recent data shows that this deficit has been reduced to 9.6 TWh in 2013.

Nuclear power
Domestically produced nuclear power accounted for 53% of the electricity consumption in Belgium during 2009. This is among the highest nuclear dependencies in Europe, less than France (79%) but more than Switzerland (40%) and Sweden (35-40%). The current plan is to phase out nuclear power by 2025. Several scenarios exist on how this phase-out can occur. Most likely resulting in an increase of greenhouse gases emitted compared to the current situation.

Renewable electricity
In 2015, the installed capacities were:
 3252 MW for solar power
2229 MW for wind power
 1422 MW for hydro-electric power
 1284 MW for biomass

According to the National Renewable Energy Action Plan Belgium has 13% RES target in 2020, up from 2% in 2005. Renewable electricity will represent the largest share of RES in 2020 (20.9%). The annual production in 2020 is estimated to be:
 10.5 TWh for wind power
 11 TWh for biomass
 1 TWh for PV solar
Wind energy will cover 9.5% of electricity. Wind capacity is estimated as 4,320 MW in 2020.

Global warming
Emissions of carbon dioxide in total, per capita in 2007 were 10 tons CO2 compared to EU 27 average 7.9 tons CO2.

See also

 Energy in Belgium
 Nuclear power in Belgium
 Wind power in Belgium

References 

Electric power in Belgium